Rakan Cop (Malay: Friends of Cops) is the Malaysian community police corps which was launched by Royal Malaysian Police in Kuala Lumpur on 9 August 2005 to help combat crime in the city and any situations around Malaysia.

External links
 Rakan Cop website
 Royal Malaysian Police website

Law enforcement in Malaysia
2005 establishments in Malaysia